Aphaniotis acutirostris, the Indonesia earless agama,  is a species of lizard in the family Agamidae. The species is endemic to Indonesia.

References

Aphaniotis
Reptiles of Indonesia
Reptiles described in 1889
Reptiles of Borneo